Jonas Björkman and Todd Woodbridge were the two-time defending champions but did not play together. Björkman partnered with Max Mirnyi and Woodbridge partnered with Mahesh Bhupathi but both pairs lost to Stephen Huss and Wesley Moodie, in the semifinals and the second round respectively.

Huss and Moodie defeated Bob and Mike Bryan in the final, 7–6(7–4), 6–3, 6–7(2–7), 6–3, to win the gentlemen's doubles title at the 2005 Wimbledon Championships In doing so, Huss and Moodie became the first qualifiers to win the men's doubles title.

Seeds

  Jonas Björkman /  Max Mirnyi (semifinal)
  Bob Bryan /  Mike Bryan (final)
  Mark Knowles /  Michaël Llodra (Quarterfinal)
  Wayne Black /  Kevin Ullyett (semifinal)
  Leander Paes /  Nenad Zimonjić (Quarterfinal)
  Mahesh Bhupathi /  Todd Woodbridge (second round)
  Wayne Arthurs /  Paul Hanley (first round)
  Simon Aspelin /  Todd Perry (first round)
  František Čermák /  Leoš Friedl (third round)
  Martin Damm /  Mariano Hood (second round)
  Cyril Suk /  Pavel Vízner (third round)
  Fernando González /  Nicolás Massú (second round)
  Julian Knowle /  Jürgen Melzer (third round)
  Gastón Etlis /  Martín Rodríguez (third round)
  Jonathan Erlich /  Andy Ram (third round)
  Yves Allegro /  Michael Kohlmann (first round)

Qualifying

Draw

Finals

Top half

Section 1

Section 2

Bottom half

Section 3

Section 4

References

External links

2005 Wimbledon Championships – Men's draws and results at the International Tennis Federation

Men's Doubles
Wimbledon Championship by year – Men's doubles